Anita Date-Kelkar is an Indian actress. She works predominantly in Marathi and Hindi television. She known for her performance in Mazhya Navryachi Bayko as Radhika.

Early life
Anita was born on 31 October 1980 in Nashik, Maharashtra. She did her schooling from M. R. Sharda Kanya Vidya Mandir, Nashik and She did Master of Arts from Lalit Kala Kendra, Pune University.

Career
She started her career in 2008 with Marathi film Sanai Choughade. She also appeared in the various Marathi films like Coffee Ani Barach Kahi, Ajoba, Popat, Seema, Gandha, Myna, A Paying Ghost, Jogwa, Adgula Madgula, etc. In 2012, she played a role in Hindi film Aiyyaa. In 2019, she did a role in Tumbbad. 

She made her television debut with Marathi serial Dar Ughada Na Gade. She did supporting role in Agnihotra, Manthan, Anamika and Eka Lagnachi Teesri Goshta and in Hindi serial she played role in Baal Veer, Bandini and Bhai Bhaiya Aur Brother. She was playing a lead role in Mazhya Navryachi Bayko on Zee Marathi. Currently, she is playing Rama in Nava Gadi Nava Rajya on Zee Marathi since 2022

Personal life 
She got married with Chinmay Kelkar who is also an actor. Before marriage, she was live in relationship with him.

Filmography

Films

Television

Theater 
 Just Halka Fulka
Mahasagar
Uney Pure Shahar Ek
Kon Mhantay Takka Dila
 Tichi 17 Prakarne
 Necropolice
 Bar Bar
 Cigarette
 Govinda Ghya Kuni Gopal Ghya
 A Bhai Doka Nako Khau
 Bai Ga Kamalach Zhali

Awards and nominations

Zee Marathi Utsav Natyancha Awards

References

External links 
 Anita Date Kelkar on IMDb
 Anita Date Kelkar on Instagram

Living people
1980 births
Indian actresses
Actresses in Marathi television
Actresses in Marathi cinema
Actresses from Maharashtra